This is the discography for Canadian punk rock band D.O.A.

Studio albums

 Something Better Change (1980)
 Hardcore '81 (1981)
 Let's Wreck The Party (1985)
 True (North) Strong And Free (1987)
 Last Scream of the Missing Neighbors (With Jello Biafra) (1989)
 Murder (1990)
 13 Flavours of Doom (1992)
 Loggerheads (1993)
 The Black Spot (1995)
 Festival Of Atheists (1998)
 Win the Battle (2002)
 Live Free Or Die (2004)
 Northern Avenger (2008)
 Kings of Punk, Hockey and Beer (2009)
 Talk-Action=0 (2010)
 We Come In Peace (2012)
 Hard Rain Falling (2015)
 Fight Back (2018)
 Treason (2020)

EPs 

 War on 45 (1982)

Compilation albums 

 Bloodied But Unbowed (1984)
 The Dawning of a New Error (1985)
 Greatest Shits (1991)
 Moose Droppings (1993)
 The Lost Tapes (1998)
 War and Peace (2003)
 Greatest Shits (2005)
 Punk Rock Singles 1977-1999 (2007)
 1978 (2019)

Live albums 
 Triumph of the Ignoroids Friends Records (Bootleg) (1981)
 Talk Minus Action Equals Zero (1991)
 The Vagabond Sessions split 12" with Potbelly. (2010)
 Welcome to Chinatown (2013)

Singles, 7"s, EPs 

 Disco Sucks (4-song 7 inch EP on Sudden Death)
 The Prisoner/Thirteen (7-inch on Quintessence)
 Disco Sucks (re-released on Quintessence)
 World War Three/Whatcha Gonna Do (7-inch on Quintessence; Ltd edition on Sudden Death)
 Triumph Of The Ignoroids (4-sing 12-inch EP on Friends Records)
 White Noise Tour (bootleg) (1980)
 Positively D.O.A. (7-inch EP on Alternative Tentacles)
 Right To Be Wild (7-inch single feat. Fuck You b/w Burn It Down)
 General Strike/That's Life (7-inch single)
 Don't Turn Yer Back... (Peel Session) (4-song 12-inch EP on Alternative Tentacles)
 Expo Hurts Everyone (7-inch EP with 3 other bands)
 It's Not Unusual (7-inch EP on Alternative Tentacles)
 The Only Thing Green
 Ken Jensen Memorial Single (7-inch EP on Alternative Tentacles)
 Sex, Drugs and Rock & Roll
 Split w/ d.b.s.
 Nervous Breakdown (Split with Dog Eat Dogma)
 Beat 'Em, Bust 'Em
 Just Play It Over And Over
 Are U Ready (Split with Thor)
 We Occupy (ft. Jello Biafra)

    Music videos
World War III
War
Dance O' Death
Takin' Care Of Business
Behind The Smile
We Know What You Want
Where Evil Grows
Death Machine
Hole In The Sky
I See Your Cross
Order
World Falls Apart
Driving To Hell And Back
Mexican Holiday
Police Brutality
Human Bomb
I Live In A Car
That's Why I'm an Atheist

Videos 

 Best of Flipside
 Live at the Assassination Club (1984)
 Warrior (1986)
 The End
 Greatest Shits Video
 Smash The State (2007)
 American Hardcore (film) soundtrack song Fucked Up Ronnie

Compilations 

 Vancouver Complication
 Let Them Eat Jellybeans!
 Rat Music For Rat People
 Something To Believe In
 Terminal City Ricochet soundtrack
 More Than A State Of Mind
 Last Call
 Short Music For Short People
 Return of the Read Menace
 You Call This Music?! Volume 1
 International P.E.A.C.E. Benefit Compilation
 Smells Like Bleach: A Punk Tribute to Nirvana
 Rock Against Bush, Vol. 1
 Canucks Punk Rock
 Guest vocal on "more drugs , more cops, more prisons" from Canadian Prog Punk band Removal
 Shut the fuck up and listen vol. 2. 7".PB Records/P.I.G. Records

Books 

 I, Shithead: A Life in Punk (Arsenal Pulp Press) link
 Talk-Action=0: An Illustrated History of D.O.A. (Arsenal Pulp Press) link

References 

Discographies of Canadian artists
Punk rock group discographies